KLLG-LP is a low power radio station broadcasting a community radio format out of Willits, California, in Mendocino County. The station is an affiliate of the syndicated Pink Floyd program "Floydian Slip."

History
KLLG-LP began broadcasting on May 23, 2014. It is operated out of the Little Lake Grange building, by volunteers.

References

External links
 

2016 establishments in California
Mendocino County, California
LLG-LP
LLG-LP
Radio stations established in 2016
Community radio stations in the United States